John Thorold  may refer to:

John Thorold (died 1700), Member of Parliament (MP) for Grantham 1685–1689
Sir John Thorold, 4th Baronet (c.1664–1717), MP for Grantham and Lincolnshire
Sir John Thorold, 9th Baronet (1734–1815), MP for Lincolnshire
Sir John Thorold, 12th Baronet (1842–1922), Conservative MP for Grantham

See also 
Thorold Baronets